Otoyol 4, named Anatolian Motorway and abbreviated as O-4, is a toll motorway connecting the northwestern Marmara Region to the Central Anatolia Region in Turkey. It runs parallel to the D.100 for more than half of its length and then parallels the D750 for most of the eastern half. The O-4 is a major expressway in Turkey as it connects eastern Istanbul and the heavily urbanized northeastern shore of the Sea of Marmara to the nation's capital, Ankara. The O-4 also makes up part of the International E-road network E80 and E89 as well as the AH-1 of the Asian Highway Network. 

The O-4 is the longest completed motorway in Turkey spanning , just  longer than the O-52. Construction of the O-4 began in 1984 and was widely completed in 1992 except for a short gap through the mountains west of Bolu. This gap was connected in 2006, with the opening of the Mount Bolu Tunnel.

Route description

Istanbul
The O-4 begins at the intersection with the O-1. The next interchange is in northern Ataşehir with the O-2 . After the motorway crosses Necip Fazıl Boulevard, the last toll-free exit in Istanbul (K1), the O-4 becomes a toll-motorway at the Çamlıca toll booths. The first tolled exit is exit K2, which is the Samandıra-Kartal connector, that is the first of several connections to the D.100. Exit K3 connects to Fatih Boulevard in Sultanbeyi. The  interchange with the O-7 is located just as the O-4 enters the district of Pendik. Exit K4 is located right on the eastern border of the Pendik district and connects to the Sabiha Gökçen Airport. After exit K4, the O-4 enters the last district in Istanbul, Tuzla. Exit K5 (Orhanlı junction) also offers a connection to the Sabiha Gökçen airport as well as the Kurtköy-Pendik connector. The O-4 continues through northern Tuzla, passing through mostly industrial parks until leaving the Istanbul Province and entering the Kocaeli Province.

Kocaeli
After crossing into Kocaeli, exit K6 is the Şekerpınar-Çayırova connector in Şekerpınar. The O-4 traverses through northern Gebze until exit K7, which is a direct connection to the D-100. After crossing over the D-100, the O-4 interchanges with the northern end of the O-5 at the unnumbered Mualimköy junction. Following the junction, the motorway runs along the heavily industrialized northern shore of the Izmit Bay with exits at Diliskelisi (K8) and Hereke (K9, K10). Between Hereke and Körfez the motorway runs directly next to the D-100 and the Istanbul-Ankara railway along the shoreline until the motorway enters Körfez. Once in the city, Exit K11 connects to the D.100. Shortly after K11, an unmarked exit to a KGM employee housing facility. The exit is not open to public traffic although cars may use the overpass to make a U-turn. After passing a service area, the O-4 enters the city of İzmit. Exit K12 connects to the D.100 but only for traffic from/to Istanbul. The route then heads north and travels around the hilly northern perimeter of the city, passing through two tunnels and a viaduct. The O-4 crosses over the D.605, which can be accessed via Exit K12. After bypassing Izmit, the motorway heads southeast, crossing over the D.100 (Exit K13) in Bahçelievler. After the exit, the route enters Sakarya Province.

Sakarya
Otoyol 4 parallels the Istanbul-Ankara railway along the southern shore of Lake Sapanca except for its short bypass around the town of Sapanca. Exit K14 connects to the town, via İzmit Avenue.

Exit List

{| class="wikitable"
|-
!width=100| Province !!width=100| District !!width=40| km !!width=40| mi !!width=30| Exit !!width=300| Destination !!width=200| Notes
|-
|rowspan="8"| Istanbul
|rowspan="3"| Ümraniye/Ataşehir
|style='background: #dcdcdc'| 0
|style='background: #dcdcdc'| 0
|| K10
||  — FSM Bridge, Mahmutbey /  — Çamlıca
|| Connector to 
|-
|style='background: #dcdcdc'| 3.3
|style='background: #dcdcdc'| 2.1
|| K1
|| Necip Fazıl Blvd.
|| 
|-
|style='background: #dcdcdc'| 
|style='background: #dcdcdc'| 
|colspan="3" style='background: #ccccff'| 
|-
|| Sancaktepe
|style='background: #dcdcdc'| 7.9
|style='background: #dcdcdc'| 4.9
|style='background: #ccccff'| K2
|style='background: #ccccff'| Kartal connector — Kartal
|style='background: #ccccff'| Connector to 
|-
|| Sultanbeyli
|style='background: #dcdcdc'| 12.6
|style='background: #dcdcdc'| 7.8
|style='background: #ccccff'| K3
|style='background: #ccccff'| Fatih Blvd. — Sultanbeyli
|style='background: #ccccff'| 
|-
|rowspan="2"| Pendik
|style='background: #dcdcdc'| 17.7
|style='background: #dcdcdc'| 11
|style='background: #ccccff'| K81
|style='background: #ccccff'|  — YSS Bridge, Istanbul Airport
|style='background: #ccccff'| 
|-
|style='background: #dcdcdc'| 20
|style='background: #dcdcdc'| 12.4
|style='background: #ccccff'| K4
|style='background: #ccccff'| Pendik connector — Pendik
|style='background: #ccccff'| Connector to 
|-
|| Tuzla
|style='background: #dcdcdc'| 21.6
|style='background: #dcdcdc'| 13.4
|style='background: #ccccff'| K5
|style='background: #ccccff'| Airport connector — S. Gökçen Airport
|style='background: #ccccff'| 
|-
|rowspan="13"| Kocaeli
|rowspan="2"| Çayırova
|style='background: #dcdcdc'| 29.6
|style='background: #dcdcdc'| 18.4
|style='background: #ccccff'| K6
|style='background: #ccccff'| Çayırova connector — Çayırova
|style='background: #ccccff'| Connector to 
|-
|style='background: #dcdcdc'| 31.4
|style='background: #dcdcdc'| 19.5
|style='background: #ccccff'| K6-1
|style='background: #ccccff'| Muhsin Yazıcıoğlu Ave. — Gebze OSB
|style='background: #ccccff'| 
|-
|rowspan="2"| Gebze
|style='background: #dcdcdc'| 39.8
|style='background: #dcdcdc'| 24.7
|style='background: #ccccff'| K7
|style='background: #ccccff'|  — Gebze
|style='background: #ccccff'| 
|-
|style='background: #dcdcdc'| 42.2
|style='background: #dcdcdc'| 26.2
|style='background: #ccccff'| K1
|style='background: #ccccff'|  — Osman Gazi Bridge, Bursa, then İzmir
|style='background: #ccccff'| 
|-
|| Dilovası
|style='background: #dcdcdc'| 46
|style='background: #dcdcdc'| 28.6
|style='background: #ccccff'| K8
|style='background: #ccccff'| Liman Ave. — Dilovası
|style='background: #ccccff'| 
|-
|rowspan="3"| Körfez
|style='background: #dcdcdc'| 52.1
|style='background: #dcdcdc'| 32.3
|style='background: #ccccff'| K9
|style='background: #ccccff'|  — Hereke
|style='background: #ccccff'| Eastbound exit, westbound entrance
|-
|style='background: #dcdcdc'| 54.5
|style='background: #dcdcdc'| 33.7
|style='background: #ccccff'| K10
|style='background: #ccccff'|  — Hereke
|style='background: #ccccff'| Eastbound entrance, westbound exit
|-
|style='background: #dcdcdc'| 67.9
|style='background: #dcdcdc'| 42.2
|style='background: #ccccff'| K11
|style='background: #ccccff'|  — Körfez
|style='background: #ccccff'| 
|-
|| Derince
|style='background: #dcdcdc'| 75.1
|style='background: #dcdcdc'| 46.7
|style='background: #ccccff'| K12
|style='background: #ccccff'|  — İzmit
|style='background: #ccccff'| Eastbound exit, westbound entrance
|-
|rowspan="3"| İzmit
|style='background: #dcdcdc'| 
|style='background: #dcdcdc'| 
|colspan="3" style="text-align:center;" |  Korutepe Tunnel 
|-
|style='background: #dcdcdc'| 
|style='background: #dcdcdc'| 
|colspan="3" style="text-align:center;" |  Gültepe Tunnel 
|-
|style='background: #dcdcdc'| 86.8
|style='background: #dcdcdc'| 53.9
|style='background: #ccccff'| K13
|style='background: #ccccff'|  — İzmit, Kandıra
|style='background: #ccccff'| 
|-
|| Kartepe
|style='background: #dcdcdc'| 94.2
|style='background: #dcdcdc'| 58.5
|style='background: #ccccff'| K14
|style='background: #ccccff'|  — İzmit
|style='background: #ccccff'| 
|-
|rowspan="4"| Sakarya
|| Sapanca
|style='background: #dcdcdc'| 101.5
|style='background: #dcdcdc'| 63.1
|style='background: #ccccff'| K15
|style='background: #ccccff'|  — Sapanca
|style='background: #ccccff'| 
|-
|| Arifiye
|style='background: #dcdcdc'| 114.1
|style='background: #dcdcdc'| 70.9
|style='background: #ccccff'| K16
|style='background: #ccccff'|  — Arifiye, Sakarya
|style='background: #ccccff'| 
|-
|| Akyazı
|style='background: #dcdcdc'| 130.8
|style='background: #dcdcdc'| 81.3
|style='background: #ccccff'| K17
|style='background: #ccccff'|  — Akyazı
|style='background: #ccccff'| 
|-
|| Hendek
|style='background: #dcdcdc'| 137.4
|style='background: #dcdcdc'| 85.4
|style='background: #ccccff'| K18
|style='background: #ccccff'| Hendek connector — Hendek
|style='background: #ccccff'| Connector to 
|-
|rowspan="2"| Düzce
|rowspan="2"| Düzce Merkez
|style='background: #dcdcdc'| 169
|style='background: #dcdcdc'| 105
|style='background: #ccccff'| K19
|style='background: #ccccff'|  — Düzce
|style='background: #ccccff'| 
|-
|style='background: #dcdcdc'| 189.8
|style='background: #dcdcdc'| 117.9
|style='background: #ccccff'| K20
|style='background: #ccccff'|  — Kaynaşlı
|style='background: #ccccff'| 
|-
|rowspan="7"| Bolu
|rowspan="4"| Bolu Merkez
|style='background: #dcdcdc'| 
|style='background: #dcdcdc'| 
|colspan="3" style="text-align:center;" |  Mount Bolu Tunnel 
|-
|style='background: #dcdcdc'| 200.9
|style='background: #dcdcdc'| 124.8
|style='background: #ccccff'| K21
|style='background: #ccccff'|  — Abant
|style='background: #ccccff'| 
|-
|style='background: #dcdcdc'| 207.9
|style='background: #dcdcdc'| 129.2
|style='background: #ccccff'| K22
|style='background: #ccccff'|  — Bolu
|style='background: #ccccff'| Bolu west
|-
|style='background: #dcdcdc'| 227.1
|style='background: #dcdcdc'| 141.1
|style='background: #ccccff'| K23
|style='background: #ccccff'|  — Bolu
|style='background: #ccccff'| Bolu east
|-
|| Yeniçağa
|style='background: #dcdcdc'| 249.6
|style='background: #dcdcdc'| 155.1
|style='background: #ccccff'| K24
|style='background: #ccccff'|  — Yeniçağa
|style='background: #ccccff'| 
|-
|rowspan="2"| Gerede
|style='background: #dcdcdc'| 259.5
|style='background: #dcdcdc'| 161.2
|style='background: #ccccff'| K25
|style='background: #ccccff'|  — Dörtdivan
|style='background: #ccccff'| 
|-
|style='background: #dcdcdc'| 266.2
|style='background: #dcdcdc'| 165.4
|style='background: #ccccff'| K26
|style='background: #ccccff'| Gerede connector — Gerede /  — Karabük
|style='background: #ccccff'| 
|-
|rowspan="6"| Ankara
|| Çamlıdere
|style='background: #dcdcdc'| 311.1
|style='background: #dcdcdc'| 193.3
|style='background: #ccccff'| K27
|style='background: #ccccff'|  — Çamlıdere
|style='background: #ccccff'| 
|-
|| Kızılcahamam
|style='background: #dcdcdc'| 326.9
|style='background: #dcdcdc'| 203.1
|style='background: #ccccff'| K28
|style='background: #ccccff'|  — Kızılcahamam, Güdül
|style='background: #ccccff'| 
|-
|rowspan="3"| Kazan
|style='background: #dcdcdc'| 
|style='background: #dcdcdc'| 
|colspan="3" style='background: #ccccff'| 
|-
|style='background: #dcdcdc'| 359.7
|style='background: #dcdcdc'| 223.5
|| K29
|| Fevzi Çakmak Ave. — Kahramankazan
|| 
|-
|style='background: #dcdcdc'| 360.8
|style='background: #dcdcdc'| 224.2
|| -
||  — Mürted Air Base
|| 
|-
|| Yenimahalle
|style='background: #dcdcdc'| 371.7
|style='background: #dcdcdc'| 231
|| K1
||  — Ankara
|| Ankara Beltway

External links
Istanbul road map
Ankara road map

References

AH1
04
Transport in Istanbul Province
Transport in Kocaeli Province
Transport in Sakarya Province
Transport in Düzce Province
Transport in Bolu Province
Transport in Ankara Province
Toll roads in Turkey
Akyazı District